Georg Büchmann (4 January 1822 – 24 February 1884) was a German philologist. He was born in Berlin, and died there in Schöneberg.

He studied theology, philology and archaeology in University of Berlin, where his instructors included August Böckh and Theodor Panofka. He worked as a schoolteacher in Brandenburg an der Havel, and later taught language courses at the Friedrich-Werder'schen trade school in Berlin (1854–77). In 1872 he attained the title of professor.

He became well known as a result of his 1864 book Geflügelte Worte, Der Zitatenschatz des Deutschen Volkes, a collection of quotations. Specifically, the book (the title of which, loosely translated, is "Winged Words") included literary quotes that had become part of common speech. It went through numerous, expanded and revised editions (14th edition, Berlin, 1884) and has been translated into various foreign languages.

References

External links
 
  
 

German philologists
Humboldt University of Berlin alumni
Writers from Berlin
1822 births
1884 deaths
German schoolteachers